is a former Japanese football player.

Playing career
Aikawa was born in Kamisato, Saitama on July 26, 1983. After graduating from high school, he joined the J1 League club Consadole Sapporo in 2002. On May 6, he debuted against Vegalta Sendai in the J.League Cup. He first played in the J1 League in November and played the last four matches in the 2002 season. However Consadole finished in last place and was relegated to the J2 League at the end of the 2002 season. He became a regular forward under the new manager Masaaki Yanagishita in 2004 and played often until 2006. However Yanagishita resigned at the end of the 2006 season, and Aikawa did not play as much under the new manager Toshiya Miura in 2007. In September 2007, he moved to the Japan Football League club FC Gifu. He scored 4 goals in 8 matches and Gifu was promoted to J2 at the end of the 2007 season. However he did not play much in 2008 and retired at the end of the 2008 season.

Club statistics

References

External links

1983 births
Living people
Association football people from Saitama Prefecture
Japanese footballers
J1 League players
J2 League players
Japan Football League players
Hokkaido Consadole Sapporo players
FC Gifu players
Association football forwards